Mahoney Creek is a stream in the U.S. state of South Dakota.

Mahoney Creek has the name of a local family.

See also
List of rivers of South Dakota

References

Rivers of Codington County, South Dakota
Rivers of South Dakota